Lise Meitner Distinguished Lecture and Medal is a colloquium-style distinguished lecture that takes place at AlbaNova University Center in Stockholm on annual basis. The lecture commemorates Lise Meitner, who spent a substantial part of her career in Stockholm. AlbaNova University Center hosts physics departments of the Royal Institute of Technology, Stockholm University and Nordita.

The Lise Meitner Distinguished Lecture is sponsored by Royal Swedish Academy of Sciences through its Nobel Committee for Physics.

Past lectures

2015: Frank Wilczek (MIT)Physics in 100 years
2016: Bert Halperin (Harvard University)Defects with Character: Zero-Energy Majorana Modes in Condensed-Matter Systems
2017: Duncan Haldane (Princeton University)Topological Quantum Matter and Entanglement
2018: Lene Vestergaard Hau (Harvard University)  The art of taming light
2019: Michael Berry (Bristol University)  Geometric phases and the separation of the world
2020: Immanuel Bloch (Max-Planck-Institute of Quantum Optics, Garching)
2021: Pablo Jarillo-Herrero (MIT)

See also

 List of physics awards

References

Physics awards
Stockholm University
Awards of the Royal Swedish Academy of Sciences